Sarap Mong Patayin is a 2021 Philippine psychological comedy thriller film written and directed by Darryl Yap. It stars Lassy Marquez, Kit Thompson, Ariella Arida, Bob Jbeili and Marion Aunor. The film was the 12th film that Darryl Yap directed.

Plot
A gay guy connives with a woman to lure men, but when they pick the wrong guy, things turn deadly.

Cast
 Lassy Marquez as Noel
 Kit Thompson as Yael
 Ariella Arida as Krista
 Bob Jbeili as Emman
 Marion Aunor as Nirvana
 Tart Carlos as Tiya Salve
 Dan Carlos Gonzales as Young Yael
 Leslie Lacap as Sumpong 1
 Faith Medina as Sumpong 2
 Beatriz Jean David as Sumpong 3

Release
The film was released in the Philippines via streaming in Vivamax on October 15, 2021.

References

External links
 

2021 films
Philippine psychological thriller films
Filipino-language films
Tagalog-language films
Philippine LGBT-related films
2021 LGBT-related films
Philippine thriller films
Philippine erotic thriller films
Films about computer hacking
Films shot in Zambales
Philippine black comedy films
Viva Films films
Gay-related films